A. Visalakshi is an Indian politician and incumbent Mayor of Tiruppur Municipal Corporation. She represents All India Anna Dravida Munnetra Kazhagam party and also serves as the party women's wing deputy secretary of Tiruppur.

References 

All India Anna Dravida Munnetra Kazhagam politicians
Living people
Women mayors of places in Tamil Nadu
Mayors of places in Tamil Nadu
21st-century Indian women politicians
21st-century Indian politicians
People from Tiruppur
Year of birth missing (living people)
Tamil Nadu politicians